Stephanie Camille Solis (born 16 November 1971) is a former road cyclist from Belize. She represented her nation at the 1992 and 1996 Summer Olympics in the women's road race. She was the first woman to represent Belize at the Olympics.

References

1971 births
Living people
Belizean female cyclists
Cyclists at the 1992 Summer Olympics
Cyclists at the 1996 Summer Olympics
Olympic cyclists of Belize
Cyclists at the 1995 Pan American Games
Pan American Games competitors for Belize
Cyclists at the 1994 Commonwealth Games
Commonwealth Games competitors for Belize
Place of birth missing (living people)